The 2023 Southend-on-Sea City Council election is due to be held on 4 May 2023 to elect members of Southend-on-Sea City Council in England. It will coincide with local elections across the United Kingdom.

The council is elected by thirds, so a single member will be elected from all 17 wards to a term of four years. The seats being elected at this election were last contested in 2019.

Council composition 
In the 2022 election, the Conservative Party and the Independents lost seats while Labour and the Liberal Democrats gained seats. While the Conservative are the largest party, the council is run by Labour led coalition along with the Liberal Democrats and Independents. Since then one Labour and one Independent councillor left their groups and formed a new group called Residents First

Notes

References 

Southend
Southend-on-Sea Borough Council elections
2020s in Essex